The Parroquia San Antonio de Padua, commonly known as the Iglesia de Curridabat is a church located in Curridabat, Costa Rica.

History
It is one of the oldest parishes in the countries, with over 400 years of history. The first church in Curridabat was a temporary structure erected by two Franciscan friars, who had assisted in the evangelization of Barva and Aserrí and who wished now to convert the people of Cacique Currirava. Later, a small adobe church was raised to replace the older wooden structure. In 1676 the church was dedicated to Saint Anthony of Padua by order of Philip II of Spain. However, little else is known as the parochial archives were destroyed in 1830 in a fire, leaving little left of two centuries of information. In 1833, Curridabat was raised to an independent parish. It was brought to fame in 1835 when during the Guerra de la Liga the forces from Cartago, which were attacking San José, commandeered the church as the depository of the miraculous statue of La Negrita, the famous Black Madonna who is patron saint of Costa Rica (and which today resides in the Basilica de los Ángeles). When they lost the battle, the statue was removed to San José as a spoil of war and placed in the old Iglesia de la Mercéd. The church was destroyed by an earthquake in 1841, and again in 1910. It was then demolished in 1923, when Curridabat's resident priest, Anselmo Palacios, decided to construct a new church. He enlisted famed Costa Rican architect Teodorico Quirós to design the church, and it was completed in 1933. Today, it is a monument of immense historic value, though it is not National Patrimony because of contention regarding administration between the diocese and the government.

References

Roman Catholic churches in Costa Rica
1638 establishments in the Spanish Empire
Buildings and structures completed in 1933
Buildings and structures in San José Province